Yellow Sands is a play which opened at the Haymarket Theatre, London on 3 November 1926, where it ran for 610 performances, and at the Fulton Theatre, New York City on 10 September 1927, where it ran for 25 performances, closing in October 1927.

Yellow Sands was written by Eden Phillpotts and his daughter Adelaide Phillpotts, produced by Sir Barry Jackson and directed by H. K. Ayliff.

The production marked the London debut of Sir Ralph Richardson.

It was adapted for a film, Yellow Sands, in 1938.

Plot
A wealthy dying woman's relatives gather, unaware that they have all been cut out of her will.

Opening night cast (New York)
Reginald Bach      
Florence Barnes      
Eileen Beldon     
Madge Burbage     
Arthur Claremont      
Wilson Colman      
Jack Livesey     
Lester Matthews
Joyce Moore   
Nellie Sheffield      
Winnie Tempest

References

External links
 Full text of Yellow Sands at HathiTrust Digital Library

1926 plays
English plays
British plays adapted into films
West End plays
Works by Eden Phillpotts